Julien Samyn (3 January 1890 – 1 April 1968) was a Belgian racing cyclist. He rode in the 1920 Tour de France.

References

1890 births
1968 deaths
Belgian male cyclists
Place of birth missing